Duane Chapman (born February 2, 1953), also known as Dog the Bounty Hunter, is an American television personality, bounty hunter, and former bail bondsman.

In 1976, Chapman was convicted of first degree murder, and 53 counts of bank robbery sentenced to five years in a Texas prison. He had been waiting in a getaway car while his friend shot and killed Jerry Oliver, 69, in a struggle during a deal to buy cannabis. Chapman served 18 months at the Texas State Penitentiary in Huntsville, Texas.

Chapman came to international notice as a bounty hunter for his successful capture of Max Factor heir Andrew Luster in Mexico in 2003 and, the following year, was given his own series, Dog the Bounty Hunter (2004–2012), on A&E. After Dog the Bounty Hunter ended, Chapman appeared in Dog and Beth: On the Hunt (2013–2015), a similarly formatted TV show, alongside his wife and business partner, the late Beth Chapman, on CMT. His latest series, Dog's Most Wanted, aired on WGN America in late 2019.

Early life
Chapman was born February 2, 1953, in Denver, Colorado, the child of Wesley Duane Chapman (1930–2000), a welder (during Dog's childhood) later turned bail bondsman (after Dog started) with Aaron Bail Bonds, who served aboard the USS Irwin during the Korean War, and Barbara Darlene Chapman (1934–1994), an Assemblies of God minister (more specifically, a Sunday school teacher). He has three siblings: Jolene Kaye Martinez (1955–2016), Michael Chapman, and Paula Hammond. He is of German and English descent on his father's side, and of English descent on his mother's side.

At the age of 15, Chapman joined the Devils Diciples, an outlaw motorcycle club, and ran away from home. In 1976, Chapman was convicted of first degree murder, and sentenced to five years in a Texas prison. He had been waiting in a getaway car while his friend shot and killed Jerry Oliver, 69, in a struggle during a deal to buy cannabis.

Chapman served 18 months at the Texas State Penitentiary in Huntsville, Texas. While he was in prison, his first wife LaFonda divorced him and married his best friend. During his incarceration, he did field work and acted as the warden's barber. In a 2007 interview for Fox News, Chapman claimed that while serving his sentence, he tackled an inmate about to be shot for attempting to escape, and a congratulatory remark by a corrections officer inspired him to become a bounty hunter later.  

As a result of his felony conviction, Chapman is prohibited from owning firearms, and has been refused entry to the United Kingdom.

Career

Capture of Andrew Luster 

On June 18, 2003, Chapman made international news by capturing Max Factor cosmetics heir, Andrew Luster, who had fled the United States in the middle of his trial on charges of drugging and raping a number of women. Luster had been convicted in absentia on 86 counts, including multiple rape charges connected to assaults in 1996, 1997, and 2000. Chapman was assisted by his hunt team, which consisted of his son, Leland, and an associate, Tim Chapman (the latter having no relation). The three bounty hunters captured Luster in Puerto Vallarta, Mexico, where they had been living under assumed names. On their way to bring Luster to the San Diego jail, they were pulled over by Mexican police, and all four of them were jailed. Dog and Leland were arrested under suspicion of drug use. Once the authorities confirmed Luster's identity, he was sent to California to face his 125-year sentence.

Chapman and his team, still in the Mexican jail, were initially denied bail, but after his wife Beth alerted the media and aroused public opinion in the United States, they were granted bail. Once out of jail on bail, they followed their attorney's advice and fled the jurisdiction, thereby becoming international bail-jumpers. On September 14, 2006, days before the expiration of the statute of limitations, Chapman, along with his son Leland Chapman and associate Tim Chapman, were arrested by United States Marshals, and jailed in Honolulu on behalf of the Mexican government.  Mexican authorities had charged all three with "deprivation of liberty," involving the 2003 arrest of Andrew Luster, because bounty hunting is illegal in Mexico. Since they did not obtain permission to leave the country while out on bail in 2003, the Mexican Government declared the three Chapmans fugitives from justice and tried to get them extradited to Mexico for sentencing. After spending one night in the federal detention center in Honolulu, Chapman told reporters "The federal marshals treated us with great respect. But let me tell you, you never want to go to a federal prison, because it's terrible."

The next day, September 15, 2006, Chapman appeared in a packed Honolulu courtroom with his ankles shackled. Although the judge agreed that the men were not a significant flight risk, he ordered that each wear an electronic monitoring device around the ankle. The three men were released on bail ($300,000 for Duane Chapman, $100,000 each for Leland Chapman and Tim Chapman). Chapman's lead attorney, Brook Hart, reportedly planned to argue that although the charge Chapman faced is a misdemeanor in Mexico, when translated into English, the charge of kidnapping became a felony under American law. Mexican authorities dismissed Hart's claim and insisted that Chapman had, in fact, been charged with a felony. An extradition hearing was set for November 16, 2006.

Chapman has speculated that his arrest was due in part to a possible prisoner exchange agreement between the Mexican and American authorities. According to Chapman, the federal agents "sold him out", by trading him in for a convicted Mexican drug lord. Duane, Leland, and Tim had their ankle bracelets removed so they could work. On October 11, 2006, reports surfaced of an open letter dated September 26, 2006, sent on Chapman's behalf by 29 Republican Congressmen to U.S. Secretary of State Condoleezza Rice.  The letter stated the authors' opposition to Chapman's extradition and requested that Rice deny Mexico's request for same. Subsequently, on October 20, 2006, lawyers for Chapman said that the Mexican federal court had granted them an order that halted the criminal case against the bounty hunter until further evidence and witness testimony were gathered. A court hearing was held on December 23, 2006. The original hearing was postponed because a report from a lower court was not yet received. The court heard both sides of the story, and then decided to recess. Then court proceedings started on January 16, 2007, and the court had until Tuesday, February 6, 2007, but the deadline was extended.

On February 16, 2007, a Mexican federal court ruled that there was no reason not to try Chapman on the charge of deprivation of liberty in Mexico. In response, on February 23, Hawaii State Representatives Gene Ward, Karen Awana, Rida Cabanilla, Lynn Finnegan, Barbara Marumoto, Colleen Meyer, Kymberly Pine, Joe Bertram, Ken Ito, Marylin Lee, and John Mizuno introduced House Concurrent Resolution 50, "Requesting the President of Mexico and the Second District Court of Guadalajara to drop extradition charges against TV Bounty Hunter, Duane 'Dog' Chapman". The resolution was passed by the International Affairs committee on March 7.

During this time, Chapman, along with his new attorney, William C. Bollard, appeared on numerous media shows. Some of these include: Larry King Live, Greta Van Susteren, Mark and Mercedez Morning Show on Mix 94.1 KMXB in Las Vegas, The Morning Show with Mike and Juliet on WFLD, Fox 6 News San Diego, The Glenn Beck Program, and THE 9 on Yahoo!. Honolulu news outlet KHNL reported on August 1, 2007, that the arrest warrant issued for Chapman and his associates might be invalidated, as a Mexican court had found that the statute of limitations regarding the arrest had expired.  The 15-page legal order was released in Spanish, and was translated and verified for legal accuracy. On September 29, 2006, Chapman received permission to have the electronic monitoring device removed temporarily so that he could travel to the East Coast for previously planned appearances. On August 2, 2007, the First Criminal Court in Puerto Vallarta, Mexico, dismissed all criminal charges pending against Duane, Leland, and Tim Chapman, on the grounds that the statute of limitations had expired. The order effectively canceled all pending charges. The prosecution appealed the ruling; this is standard practice in Mexico, according to A&E. On November 5, 2007, U.S. Magistrate Judge Barry Kurren dismissed the extradition attempt, saying that even though the cases were appealed, the trio are no longer charged with any crimes.

Dog the Bounty Hunter

Chapman, after decades of bounty hunting, was featured on Take This Job, a program about people with unusual occupations. This led him and the show's production company to do a spin-off about his work in capturing bail fugitives, in particular Chapman's efforts in hunting down Andrew Luster in Puerto Vallarta, Mexico. After Luster's jailing, Chapman was interviewed for the August 28, 2003, episode of the truTV television series Dominick Dunne's Power, Privilege, and Justice. By now Chapman's profile had come to the attention of the American public. It was during this time A&E decided to create an ongoing reality series around his bounty hunting job. On August 30, 2004, the first series of Dog the Bounty Hunter made its television debut, running for eight seasons before being canceled in 2012. The theme song was performed by Ozzy Osbourne.

In early October 2007, Chapman gained negative public attention after a private phone conversation between him and his son, Tucker, was sold to the National Enquirer. The conversation was about the relationship his son was having with a black woman. During the recording, Chapman can be heard referring to his son's girlfriend as a nigger, discussing the word use in his household, and expressing his disdain for interracial relationships. Once the tape was made public, A&E announced it was suspending production of Chapman's TV series pending an investigation.  On October 31, 2007, Chapman issued a public apology, but on November 2, 2007, A&E announced it was nonetheless removing the show from their schedule "for the foreseeable future." On February 19, 2008, A&E released a statement that said Chapman had "taken and continues to take the appropriate steps in reaching out to several African American organizations in an effort to make amends for his private comments," and announced that Chapman's TV show would return to production.

Dog and Beth: On the Hunt

On September 25, 2012, CMT announced it had ordered a new reality series which would begin airing in April 2013. The new series, titled Dog and Beth: On the Hunt, featured Chapman, his wife Beth, and Chapman's son Leland visiting failing bail bond agencies across the country, giving them advice on how to turn their businesses around, and assisting in the capture of their most wanted fugitives.

The show's pilot episode featured Chapman and his son Leland working together for the first time since Leland left the previous show in 2012. The show ran for three seasons, airing until its cancellation in 2016.

Dog's Most Wanted

In 2019, an additional spin-off featuring Dog and Beth called Dog's Most Wanted, airing for a single season.

Dog Unleashed
His new series, Dog Unleashed, was canceled in 2021, before it aired on the streaming service Unleashed. In October 2021 the production company sued Chapman for breach of contract saying that the show cancelled after Chapman allegedly made racist and homophobic outbursts and also illegally used a taser during a shoot for a show in Virginia. Chapman has denied the accusations made in the suit.

Later work
In September 2021, Chapman became involved in the manhunt for Brian Laundrie following the killing of Gabby Petito.

Author
In 2007, Chapman released his autobiography, You Can Run But You Can't Hide (co-written with Laura Morton). The book debuted at #1 on the New York Times bestseller list.

His second book, Where Mercy Is Shown, Mercy Is Given was published in 2010, also co-authored with Morton.

Appearances
Take this Job

Chapman appeared with his wife Beth on the Criss Angel Mindfreak one-hour special. Dog tied Criss Angel up to a chair and lowered him into a hot tub. After four minutes, Criss loosened the ties but could not fully free himself.
Chapman appeared as himself in an episode of George Lopez, wherein George goes to his mother's neighborhood to pick up her pet dog and meets "Dog" instead.
Chapman appeared as himself in the season two finale "The Trial" of the NBC show My Name Is Earl, capturing Joy Darville in Mexico.
Chapman and Beth attended Gene Simmons' wedding to Shannon Tweed on Gene Simmons Family Jewels.
Chapman and Beth made appearances as themselves on the Canadian television series Corner Gas in 2008.
Duane, Beth, Leland, and Lyssa Chapman all appear in the pre-credits segment of the Hawaii Five-0 episode "Na Ki'i" with Duane Chapman interacting briefly with Steve McGarrett (Alex O'Loughlin). Duane makes additional cameos throughout Season 6, with a recurring role in Season 7.
Chapman has a cameo in the television film Sharknado: The 4th Awakens, as a chainsaw dealer.
Chapman appears in the HLN series Lies, Crimes & Video episode "Secrets in Room 120" where he is interviewed about Ralph Shortey and his 2017 arrest.
Chapman competed in season seven of The Masked Singer as "Armadillo" of Team Good. He was unmasked on April 13 alongside Jennifer Holliday as "Miss Teddy" of Team Cuddly.

Personal life 
Chapman has been married six times and has 11 biological children and one adopted child; one son and one daughter have predeceased him.

Chapman's first marriage was to La Fonda Sue Darnell by whom he has two children, Duane Lee Chapman II and Leland Blane Chapman. Both sons would go on to work with Chapman at Da'Kine Bail Bonds in Honolulu, Hawaii, and appear on TV alongside their father.

His second marriage was to Ann Tegnell, with whom he has three children, Zebadiah Chapman (died as infant), Wesley Chapman, and James Robert (J.R.) Chapman. The two wed on August 22, 1979, in Colorado, shortly after Chapman was paroled after having served two years of a five-year sentence at the Texas State Penitentiary for third degree murder, and divorced sometime after the birth of Wesley. The two reconciled briefly, resulting in the birth of their son James. Ann was subsequently granted custody of both their children, and moved to Utah. Wesley was ultimately raised by his maternal grandmother, and both sons were kept from being able to communicate with Chapman; the two of them reunited with Chapman as adults.

His third marriage was to Lyssa Rae "Big Lyssa" Brittain ( Greene). The marriage was reportedly performed by a Native American chief in the Colorado mountains in 1982, and ended on November 20, 1991. The two had met just days prior in a bar, while Lyssa was still married to her husband, an Assemblies of God minister, though the two had since separated due to his infidelity. According to Chapman, he offered Lyssa $1,000 to have his child, to which she agreed. They had three children together, Barbara Katie Chapman (June 8, 1982 – May 19, 2006), Tucker Dee Chapman (September 8, 1983), and Lyssa Rae Chapman (June 10, 1987). The family lived in Denver, Colorado, in a home left to Chapman by his grandfather Mike, along with Duane Lee and Leland. According to Chapman's daughter Lyssa, she and her siblings reportedly endured a hard childhood, with incidents of sexual abuse and substance abuse plaguing the family.

His fourth marriage was to Tawny Marie Chapman. The two met in 1988, after Chapman arrested her on a drug possession charge, and she subsequently became his secretary. The two married in 1992, separated in 1994, and officially divorced in 2002. The two had no children together, though Chapman's children did refer to her as their mother during the couple’s relationship. In his autobiography, You Can Run But You Can't Hide, Chapman referred to the marriage as "a disaster from the start," alleging she was addicted to amphetamines.

His fifth marriage was to Alice Elizabeth "Beth" Barmore ( Smith; October 29, 1967 - June 26, 2019), with whom he had an on-again-off-again relationship, until the two married on May 20, 2006, at a Hilton hotel in Waikoloa Village, Hawaii. They had two children together, Bonnie Joanne Chapman (born December 16, 1998) and Garry Chapman (February 7, 2001), and Chapman adopted Beth's daughter from her previous marriage, Cecily Barmore-Chapman (née Barmore; born June 19, 1993). Chapman was also able to help Beth locate and reconcile with her son, Dominic Davis (born 1985), who was born to her when she was a teenager and subsequently placed for adoption. Dog and Beth operated Da'Kine Bail Bonds together. Beth died on June 26, 2019, at The Queen's Medical Center in Honolulu, as a result of throat cancer. She had been diagnosed with the disease in 2017. The family appeared in an A&E series titled Dog and Beth: Fight of Their Lives, to chronicle the experience.

On August 23, 2021, TMZ reported that Chapman was engaged to Francie Frane. The two reportedly met six months after Beth's passing, and like Chapman, Frane had been recently widowed, having lost her husband, Robert "Bob" Frane in December 2018. They announced their engagement in May 2020 and married in Colorado on September 2, 2021.  

Chapman has one child out of wedlock, his eldest child Christopher Michael Hecht (born 1972), who was born to his ex-girlfriend, Debbie White, while he was serving an 18-month prison sentence. Debbie kept her pregnancy from Chapman and died of suicide in 1978, leading the boy to be adopted by Keith and Gloria Hecht. Hecht has reportedly struggled with drug and alcohol addiction since at least 1991, and has a lengthy criminal history, including a history of hate crimes.

Political views
Chapman opposes bail reform and has joined movements in California, Vermont, New Jersey, and Colorado that seek to oppose or overturn bail reform laws.
In September 2022, at the Christian evangelical “Opening the Heavens” conference, Chapman called President Biden "little Hitler" and "that freak" who "stoled" [sic] the 2020 election. He predicted that Republicans would sweep the  2022 midterms and that "little Hitler" President Biden might commit suicide just like Hitler did after being "caught."

References

External links

Official website

Archived
 A&E's "Dog the Bounty Hunter"
"Best In Show" - Hawaii Business Magazine
"Dog Inc." - Hawaii Business Magazine
 

1953 births
20th-century American criminals
Bounty hunters
Participants in American reality television series
People from Denver
American Pentecostals
American people of English descent
American people of German descent
Christians from Colorado
Christians from Hawaii
Criminals from Colorado
Living people
GMTV presenters and reporters
People convicted of murder by Texas
People from Honolulu